Antonio Fernández Benítez (5 April 1942 – 22 January 2022) was a Spanish professional football player and manager.

Career
Fernández played for Atlético Malagueño and Málaga as a midfielder.

He later managed Málaga, Real Murcia, and Málaga CF. He also held other roles with Málaga CF, including in an advisory role.

Personal life
Fernández was born in Alicante on 5 April 1942. He died on 22 January 2022, at the age of 79.

References

1942 births
2022 deaths
Spanish footballers
Atlético Malagueño players
CD Málaga footballers
Segunda División players
La Liga players
Association football midfielders
Spanish football managers
CD Málaga managers
Real Murcia managers
Málaga CF managers
Málaga CF non-playing staff
Footballers from Alicante